Giorgio Vanni (Milan, Italy 19 August 1963) is an Italian songwriter and guitarist.

Biography

1963-1995: Early beginnings, the album Tomato and Grande Cuore 
Giorgio Vanni was born in Milan on 19 August 1963, and grew up in San Giuliano Milanese. He approaches to the music very early thanks to his parents which were music lovers. In 1976, when he was 13, he starts his first band called Luti's Band. Two years later he got in touch with reggae music thanks to Bob Marley's Babylon by Bus.

In 1980, he starts his first professional pop-rock group called Tomato with Paolo Costa and Claudio D'Onofrio. Two years later they be noticed by the Italian producer Roberto Colombo.

In 1983, Tomato makes the record The Island of the Sun sung by Giorgio with the pseudonym of Iudy. In 1984 Tomato works with Miguel Bosé on his album Bandido and with Den Harrow, Taffy and Ivan, too. Next year he releases his first single: Tam Tam with the collaboration of Mike Ogletree, Simple Minds' ex drummer.

In 1987, Giorgio writes the music of Lay Down on Me of XXX Miguel Bosé's album. The band has to wait another 4 years to find a record company that could give an opportunity in his music that is a mix of English pop, American black music and Italian melodies. In 1991, after Giorgio and the band work with a lot of artists like Mango, Eugenio Finardi, Cristiano De André, Roberto Vecchioni, Pierangelo Bertoli and Tazenda, he releases his first album also called Tomato produced by Mauro Paoluzzi and Angelo Carrara.

In 1992, Giorgio and the band participate in the most important Italian national music competition, Sanremo Music Festival in the newcomer category with the song Sai cosa sento per te. However Tomato doesn't get to final. After Sanremo Music Festival, Tomato breaks up.

In 1994, Giorgio releases his first solo album called Grande Cuore.

1996-1998: Career breakthrough: Max Longhi and Alessandra Valeri Manera 
An important step of artist's life is the meeting of the musician Max Longhi. In 1996 they begin to work together on TV music programs (like Generazione X on Italia 1.)and jingles. They take care of the arrangements of many advertising campaigns like Always Coca Cola which Giorgio sings the jingles but, also Dietorelle, Q8 and Brooklyn.

In 1998, Giorgio and Max write Buone verità for Laura Pausini's album La mia risposta. The song was also translate in Spanish with the title of Una gran verdad.

During Giorgio Vanni and Max Longhi's story there's the leader of the children and teenagers Mediaset television Alessandra Valeri Manera. She's the most important person in Giorgio's story because was the turning point of his career. In 1998 Giorgio and Max begin to write Italian cartoon openings for Alessandra Valeri Manera who loves their dance style. Also, Max proposes Giorgio to sing the lyrics of their music.

The first cartoon song by Max and Giorgio is Superman releases on Cristina D'Avena's album Fivelandia 16.

1999-2008: Pokémon, Dragon Ball, Cartuno and television music career 
In 1999 they write Pokémon and Dragon Ball sung by the artist, for the homonymous television series. The Japanese cartoons become a national phenomenons very soon in Italy so as well the Italian openings. They'll become two of the iconic songs of the artist's discography and story.

Thanks again to Alessandra Valeri Manera, Giorgio meets for the first time the Italian singer Cristina D'Avena who is the most iconic name and voice of Italian cartoon openings. This is another important moment. Giorgio and Max write for her Imbarchiamoci per un grande viaggio, the first of a long series of songs. During that year they write Hello Sandybell, Mille emozioni tra le pagine del destino per Marie Yvonne and Una giungla di avventure per Kimba.

In 2000, Mediaset bought the second season of Pokémon and Dragon Ball and two new songs are composed for the occasion: Pokémon: Oltre i cieli dell'avventura and What's my destiny Dragon Ball. The latter become more iconic of his previous one.

In that year in addition to be his composer, Giorgio does his first duet with Cristina D'Avena in Rossana, composed by Franco Fasano, arranged by Max Longhi and written by Alessandra Valeri Manera.

Given the success of dance music, RTI Music produces various remix album, the most famous of them is Cartuno, the first of series of four.

In 2002, Vanni and Max Longhi found LoVa Music, record company where the name is made by the first two letters of Max and Giorgio's surname.

In 2003, during the writing of TV openings and music, they compose Super Lover - I need you tonight sung by Japanese group W-inds. In Japan this song was very successful and became platinum record.

Since 2001 to 2003, Giorgio and Max write a number of Cristina D'Avena's 2000-evergreen songs like All'arrembaggio!, Hamtaro piccoli criceti, grandi avventure, Ma che magie Doremì and Doraemon.

During next years the artist's career goes hand in hand with Mediaset's decision on the children and teenagers television. Since 2004 to 2008 Giorgio Vanni write and release over fifty openings sung by him, like He-Man and the Masters of the Universe, Zoids, Keroro and Io credo in me, and Cristina, like Mirmo and Hamtaro but, also in duet, like Gadget e i Gadgettini, Pokémon Advanced and Zip e Zap.

Other Giorgio Vanni's evergreen song are Yu-Gi-Oh!, Detective Conan, L'incredibile Hulk, Maledetti scarafaggi and many other.

2009-2013: Lives, Project - I cartoni di Italia1 and Time Machine - Da Goldrake a Goku 
Since 2009, thanks to the comics conventions, Giorgio begins to do lives all over Italy. The first one was at Lucca Comics & Games. During the years the artist said that he couldn't imagine to perform live himself and that the music wrote for an audience of children, one day it would still have been loved. During this year he and Max write Blue Dragon sung by him and Cristina and Yu-Gi-Oh Duel Runner, and also sings Io credo in me (second version).

At the end of 2010, he released his first cartoon album Giorgio Vanni Project - I cartoni di Italia1. Previously all of his songs were published on Cristina D'Avena's album and compilation.

In 2011, he wrote "Beyblade Metal", a song that coincided with a long period of break of purchase of new cartoons by Mediaset that ended in 2015.

During this break Giorgio and Max focus on the production of a new album and on 4 July 2012, Time Machine - Da Goldrake a Goku was released. This is a cover album which pays homage to the songs and the artists of the past, like Massimo Dorati, Enzo Draghi and Cristina D'Avena. The tracklist begin with the 80's and ends coming back to 2000 with a What's My Destiny Dragon Ball and Go West mash-up. These two song were very similar, so the artist decided to mash-up.

2014-2015: Super Hits - Il meglio del meglio del meglio and cartoon openings returns 
On 27 May 2014, Super Hits - Il meglio del meglio del meglio was released. This is the most important Giorgio's best of because brings together mostly of Giorgio Vanni's solo production since 1998 to 2014 and new songs like Hover Champs! and Conan, il detective più famoso.

In 2015, after four years, he comes back to RTI writing the Italian opening of Lupin III - L'avventura italiana called Lupin, un ladro in vacanza. This song is a duet with the Italian rapper Moreno and for this reason was opened a very strong debate on the various social networks, also leading to the creation of petitions to change the theme, bringing an unprecedented case for a cartoon opening.

In November 2015, three of Giorgio's songs (Principesse gemelle, Doraemon, All'arrembaggio!) written for Cristina are released on vinyl on the Cristina D'Avena LP Picture disc. Also Rossana was released again.

Some changes are brought into the lives: changes of the live tracklist with songs that were less played and sung (like Occhi di gatto and Lucky Luke) and new cover songs like acoustic version of Capitan Harlock and Piccoli problemi di cuore. About changes, Giorgio and Max bring a DJ set of their song (previously remixed in Cartuno compilation).

2016-2019: YouTube and Toon Tunz 
In 2016 brings a new turning point into LoVa music's story thanks to the helps of social, YouTube in particular. On 1 August the artist releases a music video for the song Pokémon Go (composed with Max Longhi and written by Alessandra Valeri Manera) during the worldwide success of the homonymous game. The song was released also on digital stores.

At the end of the year, Mediaset buys Dragon Ball Super asking for a new Italian opening to LoVa music duo but cause to different directives by TOEI Animation, the Italian song isn't used as Italian opening. However the song is released on the same day of the Italian aired of Dragon Super (23 December) on artist's YouTube channel. The official name is Dragon Ball Super Kame Hame Ha.

After five years the artist with Max Longhi and Alessandra Valeri Manera compose a new song for Cristina D'Avena, Noi Puffi siam così released on 16 March 2017. Also the artist takes part in the Ninni Carucci's benefic project to raise money to build a music school for Amatrice after the earthquake of 24 August 2016, singing with various cartoons music artists a new song called Alza gli occhi e vai.

On 21 July Giorgio releases Sole e Luna a reggaeton song dedicated to the anime Pokémon: Sun and Moon like an unofficial opening and on 24 November a new version of Time Machine - Da Goldrake a Goku with the new name of Time Machine Reloaded - Da Goldrake a Goku.

During this part of his career, Giorgio Vanni often works with various Italian Youtuber who bring him to new music productions and to its image promotion.

In 2018 he works on Dj Matrix & Matt Joe's album Musica da giostra - Volume 5 singing a new dance song called Supereroi. Also he writes and composes new openings theme for different television networks; two new songs for Mediaset, Lupin ladro full-time and Rubami ancora il cuore for Lupin the Third Part 5. Also he sings Energia ardente and Limit Break the Italian versions of Cardfight!! Vanguard: Asia Circuit Japanese opening and ending themes. For the first time in his career he  composes and sings a cartoon opening theme, Gormiti the Legend is Back for the Italian network television RAI.

In 2019 he works again with Dj Matrix & Matt Joe on their album Musica da giostra - Volume 6 with a new song called Onda dopo onda.

Since January 2019, Giorgio reveals that he and Max Longhi are working on a new album. Meanwhile, the single Dragon Ball Super Kame Hame Ha is released in a limited special edition on 45th vinyl. This released was a no-profit initiative to raise profit to the Italian web radio RadioAnimati which the artist has often worked.

On 18 April 2019 through his social channel, the artist reveals the name of the new album: Toon Tunz. The name is a pun on the word cartoon and Tunz Tunz (an easy way to refer to LoVa music cause its dance sound). With these album a lot of the song written and sung since 2016-2019 are published for the first time on CD.

Discography 
Before Giorgio Vanni's meeting with Alessandra Valeri Manera and Max Longhi, the artist composed a lot of song for various Italian and foreign artist and for himself and jingle too.

Since 1993 to the present he and Max Longhi wrote music for Mediaset, cartoon openings in particular since the end of ninenties, for himself, Cristina D'Avena and others RTI's artist.

 Tomato
 Grande cuore
 Giorgio Vanni Project - I cartoni di Italia1
 Time Machine - Da Goldrake a Goku
 Super Hits - Il meglio del meglio del meglio
 Time Machine Reloaded - Da Goldrake a Goku (Dragon Ball)
 Toon Tunz
 ChalkZone Theme Song (ChalkZone)

Videography 
Giorgio Vanni's videography are made of music video recorded in the ninenties for Grande cuore and the new ones recorded since 2016 and published on YouTube.

References 

Children's musicians
Pop rock singers
Italian pop singers
1963 births
Italian male singers
Italian television personalities
Italian singer-songwriters
Anime singers
Living people